Ballyduff is a small rural hamlet-village in the southeastern corner of Ireland.

The village had an estimated population of 150 people in its greater area in late 2020. The village won the Tidy Towns Competition twice in the early 2000s.

Ballyduff has several facilities available to its residents, such as the Ballyduff National School, the Ballyduff Catholic Church which is adjacent to the Ballyduff Graveyard, a horse riding school, a timber and logging company, the Ballyduff Village Toddler's Cèche, a bottle bank, a botanists, a park where local small funfairs and festivals are held, a driveway paving company headquarters and two small village shops.

Ballyduff is located between the towns of Ferns and Gorey as well as the village of Camolin. Other than these settlements, Ballyduff is surrounded by farmland, primarily cattle and sheep farms.

The village is very close to the Slibh Bui mountains, which has hiking paths, nature walks and mountain biking trails available to the public, and is home to a host of natural wildlife, namely deer and birds.

Two wind turbines were erected on Slibh Bui in 2015, which help supply green energy to the surrounding communities. 

Ballyduff has a rich local culture, and is host to local legends which have been passed on through word of mouth for generations. Many places in the village, such as old stones and wells or hills and natural features are named for people from these stories, such as Patrick's Hill, (the story of an ancient King Patrick) or Mary's Well.

See also
 List of towns and villages in Ireland

Towns and villages in County Wexford